Ahmed Mohamed Saad (born 1 November 1986 in Al-Fayuum) is an Egyptian weightlifter. He competed at the 2012 Summer Olympics in the Men's 62 kg, finishing 9th.

Major results

References

External links
 
 
 

1986 births
Living people
Egyptian male weightlifters
Olympic weightlifters of Egypt
Weightlifters at the 2004 Summer Olympics
Weightlifters at the 2012 Summer Olympics
Weightlifters at the 2016 Summer Olympics
People from Faiyum
African Games gold medalists for Egypt
African Games medalists in weightlifting
Universiade medalists in weightlifting
Mediterranean Games gold medalists for Egypt
Mediterranean Games silver medalists for Egypt
Mediterranean Games medalists in weightlifting
Competitors at the 2007 All-Africa Games
Competitors at the 2013 Mediterranean Games
Universiade medalists for Egypt
Medalists at the 2013 Summer Universiade
Islamic Solidarity Games medalists in weightlifting
Islamic Solidarity Games competitors for Egypt
20th-century Egyptian people
21st-century Egyptian people